A by-election was held for the New South Wales Legislative Assembly electorate of Wollombi on 2 May 1860 because William Cape resigned to take his children to England to complete their education.

Dates

Polling places

Result

William Cape resigned.

See also
Electoral results for the district of Wollombi
List of New South Wales state by-elections

References

1860 elections in Australia
New South Wales state by-elections
1860s in New South Wales